Chromadorida is an order of nematodes belonging to the class Chromadorea.

Families:
 Achromadoridae Gerlach & Riemann, 1973
 Chromadoridae Filipjev, 1917
 Cyatholaimidae Filipjev, 1918
 Ethmolaimidae Lorenzen, 1981
 Neotonchidae Lorenzen, 1981

References

Nematodes